CKLR-FM is a Canadian radio station broadcasting at 97.3 FM in Courtenay, British Columbia. The station uses its on-air branding 97.3 The Eagle and currently broadcasts a hot adult contemporary format. The station also broadcasts on cable at 89.7 and streams live from their website. The station is owned & operated by Jim Pattison Group and is part of a division of Island Radio.

The station received approval by the CRTC on April 21, 1998, and began its on-air broadcasting on October 5, of that same year the first voice being heard on this station was Bill Nation with the morning news. Bill Nation is the only current staff member who was also with the station when it first went to air in 1998.

On November 1, 2005, Pattison and Island Radio announced that Island Radio Ltd. of Nanaimo, B.C. had agreed to sell its six radio stations (and related assets) to the Jim Pattison Broadcast Group. The stations involved in the transaction include CKLR, CKWV and CHWF in Nanaimo, CIBH and CHPQ in Parksville-Qualicum Beach and CJAV in Port Alberni.

References

External links
 97.3 The Eagle
 
 

Klr
Klr
Klr
Courtenay, British Columbia
Radio stations established in 1998
1998 establishments in British Columbia